Russell Paul Carpenter,  (born December 9, 1950) is an American cinematographer and photographer, known for collaborating with directors James Cameron, Robert Luketic and McG. He won the Academy Award for Best Cinematography for the 1997 Best Picture-winning film Titanic. Much of his work has been in blockbuster films, including Hard Target (1993), True Lies (1994), Charlie's Angels (2000) and its sequel Charlie's Angels: Full Throttle (2003), Ant-Man (2015) and XXX: Return of Xander Cage (2017). His documentary cinematography includes George Harrison: Living in the Material World, directed by Martin Scorsese. It earned six nominations at the 64th Primetime Emmy Awards, including Outstanding Cinematography for Nonfiction Programming for the cinematography team.

In 2018, Carpenter received the American Society of Cinematographers' Lifetime Achievement Award.

Early life and education
The grandson of a film sound engineer, Carpenter was born in Van Nuys, California in 1950 to a family of six. After his parents divorced in 1960, he moved with his mother and three siblings to Orange County, where he took up Super 8 films as a hobby. He enrolled in San Diego State University to study television directing, but later changed his major to English. To pay for school, he worked at a local public broadcasting channel, where he learned the ropes of documentary filmmaking. After graduating, he moved back to Orange County, where he shot educational films and documentaries.

Career
Carpenter is most widely known for his early work in horror and genre cinema and for his collaborations with directors James Cameron, McG, and Robert Luketic. His first major project as Director of Photography was the critically acclaimed 1988 ghost story, "Lady in White", written, produced and directed by Frank LaLoggia. It was followed by Critters 2: The Main Course, written and directed by Mick Garris. The Los Angeles Times criticized the film but praised Carpenter's cinematography.

Carpenter had earlier worked as a Director of Photography (DP) on numerous low-budget horror films like Sole Survivor and Cameron's Closet. In 1983, he shot The Wizard of Speed and Time, a special effects-laden experimental film directed by animator Mike Jittlov. His first major studio film was Critters 2: The Main Course.  Two years later, he shot his first science fiction film, Solar Crisis, and his first action film with Death Warrant starring Jean-Claude Van Damme. After shooting several episodes of the television series The Wonder Years, he worked on The Lawnmower Man.

During the production of the John Woo-directed action film Hard Target, Russell Carpenter and James Cameron met at the home of Edward Furlong, during his 15th birthday party. Russell was the DP for Furlong's movie Pet Semetary 2. Carpenter and Cameron collaborated on the 1994 Arnold Schwarzenegger and Jamie Lee Curtis action comedy True Lies, Carpenter told LaLoggia (the Director of "Lady in White"), that when Cameron expressed an interest in working with him and Carpenter asked why, Cameron replied "Lady in White". Their next collaboration, Titanic, which carried away eleven Oscars in 1997, including Best Picture. Carpenter's work on Titanic earned him nine industry awards and a nomination for a BAFTA Award.

Awards
 Academy Award for Best Cinematography and ASC Award for Outstanding Achievement in Cinematography in Theatrical Releases for his work on the 1997 film Titanic
 American Society of Cinematographers Lifetime Achievement Award, 2017

Personal life
Carpenter is an alumnus of Van Nuys High School and San Diego State University. He is a member of the American Society of Cinematographers (ASC).

Carpenter is married to Donna Ellen Conrad and has one son, Graham (from a previous marriage), a stepson Zak Selbert, daughter-in-law Gaudia Correia, and two granddaughters.

Filmography

Film 

Short films

Additional photography credits

Television

Awards and nominations

References

External links
 

1950 births
American cinematographers
Living people
People from Van Nuys, Los Angeles
Best Cinematographer Academy Award winners
San Diego State University alumni